"New York New York" is a 1983 song by Grandmaster Flash and the Furious Five off their compilation albums Grandmaster Flash & The Furious Five (1983) and Greatest Messages (1984). It made #17 on the R&B Singles chart, #49 on the New Zealand Singles Chart and #82 on the UK Singles Chart.

Charts

References

External links
Genius: New York New York - Lyrics

1983 singles
1983 songs
Songs written by Sylvia Robinson